Hydrolagus pallidus is a marine species of fish in the family Chimaeridae found in the Northeast Atlantic Ocean, specifically near Iceland and the Canary Islands. It is commonly known as the pale chimaera or pale ghost shark, although it is not a true shark. Its natural habitat is deepwater seas and near the mid-Atlantic ridge. H. pallidus is found at a depth range of  800 - 3650 m. This species faces a potential threat as bycatch of deepwater trawl fisheries especially as deepwater fisheries operate at greater depths. It has been recognized as distinct from Hydrolagus affinis, its closest relative, since 1990.

References

 Jonsson, G., 1992. Islenskir fiskar. Fiolvi, Reykjavik, 568 pp.
 Walovich, K.A., Ebert, D.A., Long, D.J. & Didier, D.A. (2015): Redescription of Hydrolagus africanus (Gilchrist, 1922) (Chimaeriformes: Chimaeridae), with a review of southern African chimaeroids and a key to their identification. African Journal of Marine Science, 37 (2): 157-165.

pallidus
Fish described in 1990